The World Professional Darts Championship is one of the most important tournaments in the darts calendar. Originally held as an annual event between 1978 and 1993, players then broke off into two separate organisations after a controversial split in the game. Each organisation, the British Darts Organisation (BDO) and the Professional Darts Corporation (PDC) then arranged their own World Championships, the former in January the latter in December. As a result, there was no longer was an unified world champion in the sport for nearly three decades. 

The BDO version dated back to 1978, when it was held at the Heart of the Midlands nightclub, Nottingham. The following year it moved to the Jollees Cabaret Club, Stoke, where it stayed until 1985. From then until 2019 it was held at the Lakeside Leisure Complex at Frimley Green, Surrey. In 2020 the tournament was held at The O2 Arena in London. The BDO went into liquidation in 2020 and the World Darts Federation announced later that they would be creating their own version of a World Championship, returning to the Lakeside Leisure Complex. Due to the COVID-19 pandemic, their version didn't get underway until 2022. Since qualification for the BDO version was always based on WDF rankings, most of the player pool and legacy of this new version of the World Championship is based on the old BDO system. 

The PDC version has been running since 1994 after "the split", with a field of players containing all active previous World Champions from the BDO. It was originally staged at Purfleet's Circus Tavern, Essex, before moving to its current home Alexandra Palace, London, for the 2008 World Championship.

Men's winners

British Darts Organisation

World Darts Federation

Professional Darts Corporation

By player
The following sortable table lists all winners of both versions of the World Championship (correct as of 3 January 2023).

By country
The following sortable table lists all winners of both versions of the World Championship (correct as of 3 January 2023).

Highest average progression

Women's winners

British Darts Organisation (current sponsors: Lakeside)

Professional Darts Corporation (sponsors: Unicorn)

World Darts Federation

By player
The following sortable table lists all winners of both versions of the World Championship (correct as of 10 April 2022).

By country
The following sortable table lists all winners of both versions of the World Championship (correct as of 10 April 2022).

Youth winners

British Darts Organisation

World Darts Federation (boys)

World Darts Federation (girls)

Professional Darts Corporation (current sponsors: Winmau)

References

Darts tournaments
Recurring sporting events established in 1978